The Slater Building is an historic commercial building at 390 Main Street in Worcester, Massachusetts.  The ten story building, built in 1907 by the Norcross Brothers,  was the second skyscraper in the city (after the Second State Mutual Life building, 340 Main Street).  Framed in steel, the building is clad in granite stone on its first two floors, while the upper floors are faced in limestone.  The upper two floors are set off from those below by a trim line, and have a recessed loggia framed by Corinthian columns.

In 1939 the building's interior systems were modernized by architects Frost, Chamberlain & Edwards, successors to the original designers, and then still tenants of the building.

The building was listed on the National Register of Historic Places in 1980.  It is currently the 10th tallest building in Worcester.

See also
National Register of Historic Places listings in northwestern Worcester, Massachusetts
National Register of Historic Places listings in Worcester County, Massachusetts

References

Office buildings on the National Register of Historic Places in Massachusetts
Neoclassical architecture in Massachusetts
Office buildings completed in 1907
Skyscrapers in Worcester, Massachusetts
National Register of Historic Places in Worcester, Massachusetts
Skyscraper office buildings in Massachusetts